Ghulam Husain Naseri is an ethnic Hazara politician in Afghanistan. He is the representative of the people of Maidan Wardak during the 16th term of Afghanistan Parliament.

Early life 
Ghulam Husain Naseri, was born in Behsud district of Maidan Wardak province in 1959. Nasseri began his elementary education in Behsud primary school. Then he went to Kabul and completed his secondary education and in 1971 graduated from Ghazi High School. In 2007, Naseri obtained his undergraduate degree in Islamic Law and Islamic Philosophy from Al-Mustafa International University in Qom, Iran and paid for other religious studies as well.

References 

Living people
1959 births
Hazara politicians
People from Maidan Wardak Province